"On traverse un miroir" (meaning "We Cross a Mirror") is the first single from Celine Dion's album Incognito, released on 13 April 1987 in Quebec, Canada.

Background
The B-side of this single included an unreleased song called "Ma chambre". On 25 April 1987 "On traverse un miroir" entered the Quebec Singles Chart and reached number 2, spending twenty two weeks on the chart.

A music video was made for the Incognito TV special which aired in September 1987. It was produced by Canadian Broadcasting Corporation and directed by Jacques Payette.

The song was later included on the Canadian edition of Dion's 2005 greatest hits album On ne change pas.

Track listings and formats
Canadian 7" single
"On traverse un miroir" (Edit) – 4:15
"Ma chambre" – 4:00

Charts

References

External links

1987 singles
1987 songs
Celine Dion songs
French-language songs